Our Man in Paris is a 1963 jazz album by saxophonist Dexter Gordon. The album's title refers to where the recording was made, Gordon (who had moved to Copenhagen a year earlier) teaming up with fellow expatriates Bud Powell and Kenny Clarke, both Parisian residents, and native Parisian Pierre Michelot. Powell, Clarke and Michelot, under the name The Three Bosses, had played together often in Paris since Powell moved there in 1959.

The album was remastered by Rudy Van Gelder in 2003 and released as part of Blue Note's RVG Edition series.

Music
The original intention was for the pianist on the recording to be Kenny Drew and for the music to be new compositions by Gordon. However, the actual pianist used was Bud Powell, who would not play new music, so jazz standards were chosen during the rehearsal. The two tracks added to the CD release were originally issued by Blue Note on Bud Powell's Alternate Takes in 1985.

Critical reception
The Penguin Guide to Jazz gave it a maximum four-star rating and added it to the core collection, commenting that Gordon's playing on "A Night in Tunisia" "is one of his finest performances on record" and concluding that the album is "a classic". The review of the 2003 remastered version in The Guardian was similarly positive, stating that it is "one of the all-time classics".

Track listing
 "Scrapple from the Apple" (Charlie Parker) – 7:22
 "Willow Weep for Me" (Ann Ronell) – 8:47
 "Broadway" (Billy Bird, Teddy McRae, Henri Woode) – 6:44
 "Stairway to the Stars" (Matty Malneck, Mitchell Parish, Frank Signorelli) – 6:57
 "A Night in Tunisia" (Dizzy Gillespie, Frank Paparelli) – 8:15
Bonus tracks on CD reissue
 "Our Love is Here to Stay" (George Gershwin, Ira Gershwin) – 5:39
 "Like Someone in Love" (Jimmy Van Heusen, Johnny Burke) – 6:19

Personnel

Musicians
 Dexter Gordon – tenor saxophone (except track 7)
 Bud Powell – piano
 Pierre Michelot – bass
 Kenny Clarke – drums

Production
 Francis Wolff – production and cover photography
 Reid Miles – cover design
 Claude Ermelin – recording engineering
 Ron McMaster – digital transfer engineering

References

External links 
 

1963 albums
Blue Note Records albums
Dexter Gordon albums
Albums produced by Francis Wolff